Abdul Wahab Ali (born 7 July 1958) is an Iraqi table tennis player. He competed in the men's singles event at the 1988 Summer Olympics.

References

1958 births
Living people
Iraqi male table tennis players
Olympic table tennis players of Iraq
Table tennis players at the 1988 Summer Olympics
Place of birth missing (living people)